The Tempest were an English pop band from Liverpool, active from 1984 until 1986. The group were signed to Magnet Records for £1.25 million and released four singles and an album, recording with producers Gus Dudgeon, Glenn Tilbrook and Steve Levine. Members included Ian Finney and former Prefab Sprout drummer Steve Dolder.

Members
 Mike Sheeran – vocals, guitar
 Ian Finney – guitar, backing vocals
 Lyn Smith - backing vocals
 Stuart Dunning – bass, backing vocals
 Steve Dolder – drums

Discography

Singles
"Always The Same" (7"+10"+12") 1985 (Magnet Records - PEST 1)
"Bluebelle" (7"+12") 1985 (Magnet Records - PEST 2)
"Didn't We Have A Nice Time" (7"+12") 1986 (Magnet Records - PEST 3)
"Lazy Sunday" (7"+12") 1986 (Magnet Records - LAZY 1)

Albums
The Tempest (12" unreleased in UK/bootleg) - The Tempest 1986 (Magnet Records)

References

External links
Tempest discography at Discogs.com
Article about The Tempest
Ian Finney's Blog at Blogspot

English pop music groups
Musical groups established in 1984
Musical groups disestablished in 1986
Musical groups from Liverpool